Platystacus cotylephorus, the Banded banjo, is a species of banjo catfish.  It is the only member of its genus. The genus Platystacus is the sister group to a clade containing Aspredo and Aspredinichthys. P. cotylephorus originates from coastal waters and lower portions of rivers of northern South America, from Venezuela to northern Brazil.

This species grows up to about 32.0 centimetres (12.6 in) SL and is distinguished from all other aspredinids by having 4+5 caudal fin rays. They are further distinguished from its close relatives by the absence of accessory maxillary barbels and the presence of well developed rows of unculiferous tubercles.

P. cotylephorus is usually found in brackish waters on the soft bottoms of shallow, turbid water near to the mouths of rivers. reportedly it migrates into freshwater, though spawning is believed to take place in brackish water. This species has an unusual mode of reproduction in which the eggs are attached to the underside of the female who carries them around with her until they hatch.

References

External links

Aspredinidae
Fish of South America
Fish of Brazil
Fish of Venezuela
Taxa named by Marcus Elieser Bloch
Fish described in 1794